The 2009 CONCACAF Beach Soccer Championship, also known as the 2009 FIFA Beach Soccer World Cup qualifiers for (CONCACAF), was a qualifying tournament held during June 17 – 21, 2009 in Puerto Vallarta, Mexico that determined which two participants will represent the CONCACAF region at the 2009 FIFA Beach Soccer World Cup. It was originally  scheduled to be between April 29 and May 3, 2009, however, Shortly before the tournament started, it was announced that it would be postponed indefinitely due to the growing concerns of the 2009 swine flu pandemic in the country.

Participating teams

North American Zone:
 
 
 

Central American Zone:
 
 

Caribbean Zone:

Format
The six nation tournament consisted of two three-team groups. The teams played each other once in their group during the group stage, meaning each team played two games during the group stage. The top two teams in each group advanced to the semifinals. The semifinal winners qualified for the 2009 FIFA Beach Soccer World Cup and contest the CONCACAF title.

Group stage

Group A

Group B

Fifth place

Knockout stage

Semi-finals

Third Place

Final

Winners

Qualified Teams

Awards

Final standing

External links
 Fixtures and results at CONCACAF.com

References

 
Beach
FIFA Beach Soccer World Cup qualification (CONCACAF)
Beach
2009
CON
2009 in beach soccer